Germany national racquetball team represents the German Racquetball Federation in racquetball international competitions. Competes as a member of the European Racquetball Federation and International Racquetball Federation. Germany has won the European Championships 5 times in men's competition and 4 in overall's.

History

Players
National team in the European Championship 2009

National team in the World Championship 2008

References

External links
DRV German Racquetball Federation

National racquetball teams
Racquetball
Racquetball in Germany